The Archdiocese of Łódź is an archdiocese located in the city of Łódź in Poland. The archdiocese covers the central area of Łódź Voivodeship. As of 2016 weekly mass attendance was 23.4% of the archdiocese's Catholic population, making it the second least devout diocese in Poland after the Archdiocese of Szczecin-Kamień (22.7%).

History
 December 10, 1920: Established as Diocese of Łódź
 March 25, 1992: Promoted as Metropolitan Archdiocese of Łódź

Leadership

 Bishops 
 Vincenzo Tymieniecki (1921.04.11 – 1934.08.10)
 Włodzimierz Bronisław Jasiński (1934.11.30 – 1946.12.12)
 Michał Klepacz (1946.12.20 – 1967.01.29)
 Józef Rozwadowski (1968.10.29 – 1986.01.24)
 Władysław Ziółek (1986.01.24 – 1992.03.25)
 Archbishops
 Władysław Ziółek (1992.03.25 – 2012.07.11)
 Marek Jędraszewski (2012.07.11 – 2017.01.27)
 Grzegorz Ryś (2017.09.14 – present)

Suffragan dioceses
 Łowicz

See also
Roman Catholicism in Poland

References

External links
 GCatholic.org
 Catholic Hierarchy
  Diocese website

Roman Catholic dioceses in Poland
Christian organizations established in 1920
Organisations based in Łódź
Roman Catholic dioceses and prelatures established in the 20th century